The Passion of Darkly Noon is a 1995 psychological horror drama film written and directed by Philip Ridley. The film stars Brendan Fraser, Ashley Judd, and Viggo Mortensen.

The protagonist's name and film title come both from a passage in the Bible, 1 Corinthians 13: "Now we see through a glass, darkly...".

For the film Ridley was awarded the Best Director Prize at the Porto Film festival.

Plot 
Darkly Noon (Brendan Fraser), whose name comes from a Bible passage, is a young man who has spent his entire life as a member of an ultraconservative Christian cult.  After a violent incident in which the cult is dissolved and Darkly's parents die, a disoriented Darkly wanders into a forest in the Appalachian region of North Carolina. He is rescued from exhaustion by a coffin transporter named Jude (Loren Dean) and his friend Callie (Ashley Judd).

Jude leaves Darkly in Callie's care.  As Callie nurses him back to health, Darkly becomes frustrated by the conflict between his religious past and his attraction to his new companion.  His frustration intensifies when Clay (Viggo Mortensen), Callie's mute boyfriend, who builds the coffins Jude sells, returns home after being away for a few days. Darkly's inner turmoil further builds after he encounters Clay's mother, Roxy (Grace Zabriskie), who despises the relationship between Clay and Callie.  Roxy tells Darkly that she believes that Callie is a witch bent on destroying Roxy's family.

Despite his detached behavior, Darkly becomes good friends with Jude. One day, Darkly discovers a bizarre giant shoe on the river, and when Roxy's dog dies, they place the body in the shoe and set it on fire as a floating funeral pyre.

Jude proposes that he and Darkly move away to live together. Darkly agrees, and Jude leaves with plans to return for Darkly. Overcome with loneliness, Roxy commits suicide. After finding Roxy's body, Darkly hallucinates that his dead parents are telling him to kill Callie.

Now thoroughly unhinged, Darkly wraps himself in barbed wire, paints himself red, and arms himself with one of Clay's chisels. He bursts into Callie and Clay's house, intent on murdering the couple, whom he discovers having sex. During the horrific attack, a fire starts, which quickly burns down the house.

Jude arrives and sees the inferno. Rifle in hand, Jude enters to rescue Callie and Clay. When Callie tells Darkly that she loves him, Darkly hesitates, giving Jude the opportunity to shoot him. "Who will love me now?" are Darkly's last words as he dies in Callie's arms.

The next morning, while Callie, Clay, and Jude view the ruins of the house, a family of circus people arrive. They claim to have lost all their supplies and ask if anyone had seen their giant shoe.

The group decides to go for help together. One of the children gives Callie a shoe which resembles the giant shoe.

Cast 
 Brendan Fraser as Darkly Noon
 Ashley Judd as Callie
 Viggo Mortensen as Clay
 Loren Dean as Jude
 Lou Myers as Quincy
 Grace Zabriskie as Roxy

Critical reception 
Entertainment Weekly called The Passion of Darkly Noon "an unintended comedy with a scorcher of an ending", citing poor acting, over-the-top dialogue and implausible plot twists. Conversely, Fangoria magazine praised the film, citing especially the performance of Brendan Fraser.

Leading UK film critic Mark Kermode has raved about the film calling it "One of my favourite cinematic experiences of recent years" and also citing it as "[Ridley's] great unsung work."

Like Ridley's previous film The Reflecting Skin it has developed a cult following and in 2014 made the top 10 in The Daily Telegraph's list of the 50 most underrated films of all time.

References

External links 
 
 

1995 films
1995 drama films
1995 horror films
1990s horror drama films
1990s psychological films
1990s psychological drama films
1990s psychological horror films
British drama films
British horror films
British horror drama films
British psychological films
British psychological drama films
British psychological horror films
German drama films
German horror films
Belgian horror drama films
1990s English-language films
English-language German films
Films about religion
Religious horror films
Films about cults
Films directed by Philip Ridley
1990s British films
1990s German films